Siratus is a genus of sea snails, marine gastropod mollusks in the subfamily Muricinae of the family Muricidae, the murex snails or rock snails.

Species
Species within the genus Siratus include:
 Siratus aguayoi (Clench & Perez Farfante, 1945)
 Siratus alabaster (Reeve, 1845)
 Siratus articulatus (Reeve, 1845)
 Siratus beauii (Fischer & Bernardi, 1857)
 Siratus bessei (Houart, 2000)
 Siratus cailletti (Petit, 1856)
 Siratus carolynae (Vokes, 1990)
 Siratus caudacurtus (Houart, 1999)
 Siratus ciboney (Clench & Perez Farfante, 1945)
 Siratus colellai (Houart, 1999)
 Siratus coltrorum (Vokes, 1990)
 Siratus consuela (A. H. Verrill, 1950)
 Siratus cracens Houart, 2014
 Siratus evelynae Houart, 2012 
 Siratus formosus (Sowerby, 1841)
 Siratus guionneti (Merle, Garrigues & Pointier, 2001)
 Siratus gundlachi (Dunker, 1883)
 † Siratus harzhauseri Landau & Houart, 2014 
 Siratus hennequini (Houart, 2000)
 † Siratus hirmetzli Z. Kovács, 2018 
 † Siratus komiticus (Suter, 1917) 
 Siratus kugleri (Clench & Perez Farfante, 1945)
 Siratus lamyi Merle & Garrigues, 2008
 Siratus michelae Houart & Colomb, 2012 
 Siratus motacilla (Gmelin, 1791)
 Siratus perelegans (Vokes, 1965)
 Siratus pliciferoides (Kuroda, 1942)
 Siratus pointieri Merle & Garrigues, 2011
 Siratus senegalensis (Gmelin, 1791)
 Siratus springeri (Bullis, 1964)
 † Siratus syngenes (Finlay, 1930) 
 Siratus tenuivaricosus (Dautzenberg, 1927)
 Siratus thompsoni (Bullis, 1964)
 Siratus vokesorum (Garcia, 1999)
Species brought into synonymy
 Siratus gallinago (G. B. Sowerby III, 1903): synonym of Vokesimurex gallinago (G. B. Sowerby III, 1903)
 Siratus hirasei Shikama, 1973: synonym of Siratus pliciferoides (Kuroda, 1942)
 Siratus vicdani Kosuge, 1980 : synonym of Siratus pliciferoides (Kuroda, 1942)

References

 Merle D., Garrigues B. & Pointier J.-P. (2011) Fossil and Recent Muricidae of the world. Part Muricinae. Hackenheim: Conchbooks. 648
 Houart R. (2012) Description of a new species in the Siratus pliciferoides group (Gastropoda: Muricidae) from the Philippines. Novapex 13(1): 25-28
 Houart, R. (2014). Living Muricidae of the world. Muricinae. Murex, Promurex, Haustellum, Bolinus, Vokesimurex and Siratus. Harxheim: ConchBooks. 197 pp.

External links
 Jousseaume, F. P. (1880). Division méthodique de la famille des Purpuridés. Le Naturaliste. 2(42): 335-338

 
Muricinae
Gastropod genera
Gastropods described in 1880
Taxa named by Félix Pierre Jousseaume